The Vela Pulsar (PSR J0835-4510 or PSR B0833-45) is a radio, optical, X-ray- and gamma-emitting pulsar associated with the Vela Supernova Remnant in the constellation of Vela. Its parent Type II supernova exploded approximately 11,000–12,300 years ago (and was about 800 light-years away).

Characteristics 
It has the third-brightest optical component of all known pulsars (V = 23.6 mag) which pulses twice for every single radio pulse. The Vela pulsar is the brightest persistent object in the high-energy gamma-ray sky.

Glitches 
Glitches are sudden spin-ups in the rotation of pulsars. Vela is the best known of all the glitching pulsars, with glitches occurring on average every three years. Glitches are currently not predictable.

On 12 December 2016, Vela was observed to glitch live for the first time with a radio telescope (the 26 m telescope at the Mount Pleasant Radio Observatory) large enough to see individual pulses. This observation showed that the pulsar nulled (i.e. did not pulse) for one pulse, with the pulse prior being very broad and the two following pulses featuring low linear polarization. It also appeared that the glitch process took under five seconds to occur.

On 22 July 2021, a new glitch occurred. As a result, the period of the pulsar decreased by about 1 part in a million.

Research campaigns 
The association of the Vela pulsar with the Vela Supernova Remnant, made by astronomers at the University of Sydney in 1968, was direct observational proof that supernovae form neutron stars.

Studies conducted by Kellogg et al. with the Uhuru spacecraft in 1970–71 showed the Vela pulsar and Vela X to be separate but spatially related objects. The term Vela X was used to describe the entirety of the supernova remnant. Weiler and Panagia established in 1980 that Vela X was actually a pulsar wind nebula, contained within the fainter supernova remnant and driven by energy released by the pulsar.

Nomenclature 
The pulsar is occasionally referred to as Vela X, but this phenomenon is separate from either the pulsar or the Vela X nebula. A radio survey of the Vela-Puppis region was made with the Mills Cross Telescope in 1956–57 and identified three strong radio sources: Vela X, Vela Y, and Vela Z. These sources are observationally close to the Puppis A supernova remnant, which is also a strong X-ray and radio source.

Neither the pulsar nor either of the associated nebulae should be confused with Vela X-1, an observationally close but unrelated high-mass X-ray binary system.

In music 
The emissions of Vela and the pulsar PSR B0329+54 were converted into audible sound by French composer Gérard Grisey and used in the piece Le noir de l'étoile (1989–90).

Gallery

References

External links 

 Vela Pulsar at SIMBAD
 Vela Pulsar at NASA/IPAC Extragalactic Database

Gum Nebula
Pulsars
Vela (constellation)
Optical pulsars
Articles containing video clips